Norway competed at the 2018 European Athletics Championships in Berlin, Germany, from 6–12 August 2018. A delegation of 33 athletes were sent to represent the country.

Results 

 Men 
 Track and road

Field events

Combined events – Decathlon

Women
 Track and road

Field events

References

Nations at the 2018 European Athletics Championships
Norway at the European Athletics Championships
European Athletics Championships